The 1975 Tulsa Golden Hurricane football team represented the University of Tulsa during the 1975 NCAA Division I football season. In their fourth year under head coach F. A. Dry, the Golden Hurricane compiled a 7–4 record, 4–0 against Missouri Valley Conference opponents, and won the conference championship.

The team's statistical leaders included Jeb Blount with 1,663 passing yards, Carlisle Cantrell with 914 rushing yards, and Steve Largent with 1,000 receiving yards. Largent went on to play 14 years in the National Football League and was inducted into the Pro Football Hall of Fame. Punter Rick Engles was selected as a first-team All-American by The Sporting News and Time magazine.

Schedule

Roster

References

Tulsa
Tulsa Golden Hurricane football seasons
Missouri Valley Conference football champion seasons
Tulsa Golden Hurricane football